Pseudocoladenia is an Indomalayan genus of spread-winged skippers in the family Hesperiidae.

Species
Pseudocoladenia dan (Fabricius, 1787)   
Pseudocoladenia dea (Leech, 1894)  South China (Zhejiang, Anhui, Hubei, Sichuan)
Pseudocoladenia festa (Evans, 1949)  Assam, Sikkim, Bhutan, Burma, Southwest China (Yunnan, Sichuan) 
Pseudocoladenia fatih (Kollar, 1844) India, Nepal
Pseudocoladenia fatua (Evans, 1949)  Sikkim, Bhutan, Assam, Burma, Tibet 
Pseudocoladenia pinsbukana (Shimonoya & Murayama, 1976)  Taiwan

References

Natural History Museum Lepidoptera genus database

Celaenorrhinini
Hesperiidae genera
Taxa named by Takashi Shirozu